The 1986 Girabola was the eighth season of top-tier football competition in Angola. Estrela Clube Primeiro de Maio were the defending champions.

The league comprised 14 teams, the bottom three of which were relegated.

Petro Luanda were crowned champions, winning their 3rd title, while Desportivo de Benguela, Inter da Lunda Sul and Leões de Luanda were relegated.

Arsénio Ribeiro aka Túbia of Inter de Luanda finished as the top scorer with 20 goals.

Changes from the 1985 season
Relegated: Dínamos do Kwanza Sul, Gaiatos de Benguela, Leões do Planalto
Promoted: FC de Cabinda, Inter da Lunda Sul, Leões de Luanda

League table

Results

Season statistics

Most goals scored in a single match

External links
Federação Angolana de Futebol

Angola
Angola
Girabola seasons